Wang Chien-fa (born 19 March 1949) is a politician in Taiwan. He was the Magistrate of Penghu County from 20 December 2005 until 25 December 2014.

Education
Wang obtained his bachelor's degree from the Department of Public Administration at National Open University.

Penghu County Magistrate

2005 Penghu County Magistracy election
Wang was elected Magistrate of Penghu County as the Kuomintang candidate on 3 December 2005 and assumed office on 20 December 2005.

2009 Penghu County Magistracy election
Wang was reelected for a second term on 5 December 2009.

See also
 Penghu County Government

References

1949 births
Living people
Magistrates of Penghu County